Michael Moody is General Manager and co-founder of The Grange Festival.

Having worked with Australian Opera, Garsington and Wexford opera festivals, he then co-founded (with Wasfi Kani) both Grange Park Opera and Nevill Holt festivals. He has been involved with the Pimlico Opera prison project since 1996 and directed The Threepenny Opera - HMP Winchester, West Side Story - HMP Winchester and Wandsworth, Guys and Dolls - Wormwood Scrubs, Chicago - HMP Bronzefield, Les Miserables - HMP Wandsworth and Erlestoke, Sugar - HMP Send, Sister Act  - HMP Bronzefield and Our House with Suggs at HMP Isis.

Moody was the executive director of Grange Park Opera from 1998 to 2016. In January 2016, he left to establish a new company, The Grange Festival.  Created to continue opera seasons at The Grange, Northington from 2017 onwards, The Grange Festival was formed with Michael Chance as artistic director and Rachel Pearson and Michael Moody as co-founders.

References

Businesspeople from Winchester
English music managers
Living people
Year of birth missing (living people)